Artyom Kuchin (Russian: Артём Кучин; born 12 December 1977) is a Kazakhstani international referee who refereed at 2014 FIFA World Cup qualifiers.

References

External links 
 
 
 
 

1977 births
Living people
Kazakhstani football referees
UEFA Champions League referees
UEFA Europa League referees